Film of the Year is one of the main categories of Dorian Awards, given annually by GALECA: The Society of LGBTQ Entertainment Critics since 2010 (the group was initially named the Gay and Lesbian Entertainment Critics Association). The Dorians go to both mainstream and LGBTQ-centric content.

List of winners 
 2009 – A Single Man, directed by Tom Ford
 2010 – I Am Love, directed by Luca Guadagnino
 2011 – Weekend, directed by Andrew Haigh
 2012 – Argo, directed by Ben Affleck
 2013 – 12 Years a Slave, directed by Steve McQueen
 2014 – Boyhood, directed by Richard Linklater
 2015 – Carol, directed by Todd Haynes
 2016 – Moonlight, directed by Barry Jenkins
 2017 – Call Me by Your Name, directed by Luca Guadagnino
 2018 – The Favourite, directed by Yorgos Lanthimos
 2019 – Parasite, directed by Bong Joon-ho
 2020 – Nomadland, directed by Chloé Zhao
 2021 – The Power of the Dog, directed by Jane Campion
 2022 – Everything Everywhere All At Once, directed by Daniel Kwan and Daniel Scheinert, aka Daniels

References

External links 
 GALECA Official Website

Awards for best film